This article lists results for GNK Dinamo Zagreb in European competition.

After winning the first post-war Zagreb municipal championship held in January and February 1946 and finishing runners-up in the Croatian regional championship (behind Hajduk Split), they qualified for the nationwide 1946–47 Yugoslav First League. The club spent their entire existence playing top-flight football, and they soon established themselves as one of the Yugoslav Big Four (along with Hajduk Split, Partizan and Red Star Belgrade), finishing runners-up in the inaugural season of the national championship, and then winning Yugoslav titles in 1948, 1954 and 1958.

They were the third Yugoslav club to play in an UEFA-sponsored competition (after Partizan in 1955 and Red Star in 1956) and their first European Cup tie was against Czechoslovak side Dukla Prague in 1958. In the 1960s Dinamo experienced their most successful period in both domestic and European football which saw them win four Yugoslav Cups but failing to clinch a single championship title, finishing runners-up five times between 1960 and 1969. On the European stage, the club had two successful campaigns in the Inter-Cities Fairs Cup, reaching the finals on two occasions. In the 1963 final Dinamo lost to Valencia, but in 1967 they beat England's Leeds United. This was the only European silverware won by a Yugoslav club until Red Star Belgrade won the 1990–91 European Cup 24 years later.

Dinamo in Europe
Dinamo played their first European match on 10 September 1958 against Dukla Prague. The match ended in a 2–2 draw, with Luka Lipošinović netting a brace and Jaroslav Borovička and Jan Brumovský scoring for the Czech side. The second leg was played on 1 October, with Franjo Gašpert scoring in a 1–2 loss and a 3–4 aggregate defeat.
Biggest defeat was against Barcelona in the away game of the second round of ICFC. The game was played on 13 December 1961 and ended in a 5–1 trashing, with Evaristo de Macedo scoring a hat-trick. Other scorers for Barcelona were Sándor Kocsis and Chus Pereda, while Dražan Jerković claimed a consolation goal in the 87th minute. The second leg in Zagreb ended in a 2–2 draw, with two goals from Stjepan Lamza and another goal from Evaristo de Macedo and Pedro Zaballa to make it 7–3 on aggregate for the Catalan club.
In the 1962–63 season Dinamo enjoyed a successful campaign in the ICFC. Dinamo beat Porto 2–1 with goals from Borislav Ribic and Ilijas Pašić.
In the 1982–83 season Dinamo was knocked out in the first round, this time by Sporting CP. Dinamo won the first leg at Maksimir by a single goal from Snješko Cerin, but then lost the away leg 3–0 with a hat-trick from Sporting's António Oliveira.
In the 1988–89 season Dinamo was knocked out in the second round of the UEFA cup by VfB Stuttgart, coached by Arie Haan and featuring Jurgen Klinsmann and Srečko Katanec. Stuttgart later reached the finals of the competition, only to be beaten by Diego Maradona's Napoli. In the 2019–20 season Dinamo finished on the last position in the Champions League group with Shakhtar, Manchester City and Atalanta.

Summary

By competition
Note: This summary includes matches played in the Inter-Cities Fairs Cup, which was not endorsed by UEFA and is not counted in UEFA's official European statistics.Defunct competitions are listed in italics.
Pld = Matches played; W = Matches won; D = Matches drawn; L = Matches lost; GF = Goals for; GA = Goals against

Last updated on 17 November 2022. after match Chelsea - GNK Dinamo 2:1, Source: UEFA.com

By ground

Last updated on 17 November 2022. after match Chelsea - GNK Dinamo 2:1, Source: UEFA.com

1 Includes two matches where Dinamo played as hosts away from their home stadium. (The 1991–92 UEFA Cup fixture against Trabzonspor, played in Klagenfurt, Austria on 17 September 1991; and the 1993–94 Champions League first-round game versus Steaua Bucharest played in Ljubljana, Slovenia on 28 September 1993.)

2 Includes two playoff matches before the introduction of penalties and the away goals rule in two-legged fixtures. (The 1962–63 Inter-Cities Fairs Cup game against Union Saint-Gilloise, played in Linz, Austria, on 13 February 1963; and the 1963–64 Cup Winners' Cup game versus Linzer ASK, also played in Linz, Austria, on 23 October 1963.)

Best results in international competitions

List of matches
Note: Dinamo score always listed first.

Last updated: 2 November 2022

List of opponents

List of opponents by nation

Last game updated: Chelsea 2–1 Dinamo Zagreb (2 November 2022)

GER – Including games against German clubs representing East Germany and West Germany in European competitions.
SCG – Including games against Serbian clubs representing Serbia and Montenegro in European competitions.
TCH – Including games against Czech and Slovak clubs representing Czechoslovakia in European competitions.

List of opponents by club

Last game updated: Chelsea 2–1 Dinamo Zagreb (2 November 2022)

Player records
Last updated after match against  Chelsea on 2 November 2022.

Most appearances in UEFA club competitions
Arijan Ademi: 104 appearances
Sammir: 76 appearances
Dominik Livaković: 70 appearances
Mislav Oršić: 70 appearances
Bruno Petković: 60 appearances
Amer Gojak: 53 appearances
Milan Badelj: 52 appearances
Kévin Théophile-Catherine: 50 appearances
Rudolf Belin: 49 appearances
Mihael Mikić: 48 appearances
Edin Mujčin: 48 appearances
Petar Stojanović: 48 appearances

Top scorers in UEFA club competitions
Mislav Oršić: 28 goals
Bruno Petković: 19 goals
Igor Cvitanović: 15 goals
Slaven Zambata: 15 goals
Sammir: 13 goals
Hillal Soudani: 13 goals
Arijan Ademi: 13 goals
Mario Mandžukić: 11 goals
Marijan Novak: 10 goals
Dražan Jerković: 9 goals

UEFA Team ranking

The following data indicates Dinamo coefficient rankings.

As of 12 September 2022

References
General

Specific

External links

Europe
Croatian football clubs in international competitions
Yugoslav football clubs in international competitions